Catherine Dulac is a French-American biologist. She is the Higgins Professor in Molecular and Cellular Biology at Harvard University, where she served as department chair from 2007 to 2013. She is also an investigator at the Howard Hughes Medical Institute. She was born in 1963 in France. She came to the United States for her postdoctoral study in 1991.

Dulac has done extensive research on the molecular biology of olfactory signaling in mammals, particularly including pheromones, and downstream brain circuits controlling sex-specific behaviors. She developed a novel screening strategy based on screening cDNA libraries from single neurons and a new method of cloning genes from single neurons. As a postdoc, Dulac discovered the first family of mammalian pheromone receptors when working in Nobel laureate Richard Axel's laboratory at Columbia University.

Biography
Dulac grew up in Montpellier, France, graduated from the École Normale Supérieure de la rue d'Ulm, Paris, and earned a Ph.D. in developmental biology from the University of Paris in 1991. She worked with Nicole Le Douarin on developmental biology, and carried out her postdoc studies with Richard Axel at Columbia University where she identified the first genes encoding mammalian pheromone receptors.

Dulac joined the faculty of Harvard Molecular and Cell Biology in 1996, She was promoted to associate professor in 2000 and full professor in 2001. She is currently an investigator at the Howard Hughes Medical Institute and was the Chair of Harvard's Department of Molecular and Cellular Biology until 2013. She teaches three graduate level course including Molecular Basis of Behavior, Molecular and Cellular Biology of the Senses and Their Disorders, and Molecular and Developmental Biology Neurobiology.

Publications

Notable papers

Other

Awards and honors
 1998 Searle Scholar
 2004 Member, American Academy of Arts and Sciences
 2006 Richard Lounsbery Award
 2007 Member, French Academy of Sciences
 2010 Perl-UNC Prize
 2015 Pradel Research Award by the National Academy of Sciences
 2017 Scolnick Prize by the McGovern Institute
 2018 Karl Spencer Lashley Award
 2019 Ralph W. Gerard Prize in Neuroscience
 2021 Breakthrough Prize in Life Sciences
She was elected a Member of the American Philosophical Society in 2019.

References

External links

Research Summary & Profile, Harvard University
HHMI profile
"Pheromones Control Gender Recognition in Mice", January 31, 2002 (HHMI Research News)
"Harvard Portrait: Catherine Dulac",
"Making the Paper: Catherine Dulac", Nature, v.448 (August 30, 2007).
Catherine Dulac Seminars

1963 births
Living people
21st-century American biologists
Howard Hughes Medical Investigators
University of Paris alumni
Columbia University people
Harvard University faculty
Fellows of the American Academy of Arts and Sciences
Members of the French Academy of Sciences
American women biologists
Members of the American Philosophical Society
Members of the United States National Academy of Sciences
Richard-Lounsbery Award laureates
American neuroscientists
American women neuroscientists
American women academics
French emigrants to the United States
21st-century American women scientists